Mataeo Chandler Razario Bunbury (born June 13, 2005) is a Canadian professional soccer player who currently plays for Birmingham Legion FC in the USL Championship.

Early life
Bunbury began playing soccer at age three with Lakeville SC. In 2016, he joined the Sporting CP Youth Academy in Portugal. Later, he played for Minneapolis United SC, before joining the Minnesota United academy, leaving the club in 2020 when the academy ceased operating. Afterwards, he joined the Sporting Kansas City academy, playing for the club's Under-17 and Under-19 age groups. He became the third member of his family to join the organization, after his father Alex and older brother Teal previously played for the MLS side.

Club career
On September 22, 2021, Bunbury signed a USL academy contract with USL Championship side Sporting Kansas City II, allowing him to retain his NCAA eligibility. He made his professional debut on September 24, 2021, appearing as an 85th-minute substitute during a 1–1 draw with FC Tulsa. After SKC II's move to MLS Next Pro for 2022, he signed another non-professional academy contract, Bunbury scored his first professional goal on April 3, 2022 against Minnesota United 2. In July 2022, Bunbury had departed Sporting Kansas City, after requesting a first-team contract, but being deemed unready by senior team coach Peter Vermes.

Bunbury signed with USL Championship club Birmingham Legion FC on July 8, 2022. He made his debut the next day in a substitute appearance against the Charleston Battery. He scored his first goal on July 27, scoring a penalty kick against Loudoun United.

International career
Bunbury is eligible for both the United States and Canada.

In March 2019, he attended a camp with the United States U14 team.

In April 2022, Bunbury accepted a call-up to the Canadian Under-20 side for two friendly matches against Costa Rica.

Personal
Mataeo is the son of former professional soccer player Alex Bunbury and the younger brother of fellow professional soccer player Teal Bunbury and actress Kylie Bunbury.

References

External links 
 

2005 births
Living people
Association football forwards
People from Prior Lake, Minnesota
Soccer players from Minnesota
Citizens of Canada through descent
Canadian soccer players
Canadian sportspeople of Guyanese descent
American sportspeople of Canadian descent
American sportspeople of Guyanese descent
American soccer players
Canada men's youth international soccer players
USL Championship players
MLS Next Pro players
Sporting Kansas City II players
Birmingham Legion FC players